Talebabad (also Romanized as Ţālebābād; also known as Taleb Abad Torob Gowdeh) is a village in Licharegi-ye Hasan Rud Rural District, in the Central District of Bandar-e Anzali County, Gilan Province, Iran. At the 2006 census, its population was 1,992, in 572 families.

References 

Populated places in Bandar-e Anzali County